Haiwen & Partners is a Chinese law firm focused on cross-border securities, M&A transactions, private equity, general corporate and commercial dispute resolution practice. Haiwen is a fully integrated partnership with a modified lockstep compensation system.

Haiwen currently has around 200 lawyers in total working at its Beijing, Shanghai, Shenzhen and Hong Kong offices.

Compared with most major PRC law firms, Haiwen & Partners maintains a relatively small number of attorneys and focuses on capital market and M&A practices. Haiwen & Partners is one of the "Red Circle" law firms in PRC China.

History 
Haiwen & Partners was founded in May 1992. The founding partners of Haiwen include Duke Law School graduate Gao Xiqing, who was the first Chinese citizen to pass the New York Bar exam and later became the President and Chief Investment Officer of the China Investment Corporation.

Firm Culture  
Haiwen is known for its relatively mild corporate culture. As Jiping Zhang, Haiwen's management partner, mentioned in a recent interview:

Recent Transactions 
 In 2017, Haiwen & Partners worked on Jianpu Technology's offering of 22,500,000 ADSs at NYSE.
In 2015, Haiwen & Partners advised China International Capital Corporation Limited's 1 billion Hong Kong IPO.
In recent years, Haiwen & Partners began to expand its practice into Media, Intellectual Property, and Entertainment Law. Recent notable projects advised by Haiwen & Partners include deal on opening the first Universal Studios theme park in China, and IMAX China's Hong Kong IPO in 2015.

Practice Areas 

 M&A and Corporate
 Dispute Resolution
 Antitrust/Competition
 Intellectual Property
 Media
 Tax
 Capital Markets/Securities

See also 
 Legal History of China
 Chinese law

References

External links 
 Haiwen & Partners official website

Law firms of China
Companies based in Beijing
1992 establishments in China
Law firms established in 1992